Thomas J. Brandon (1908–1982) was a founding member of the New York Workers Film and Photo League.  He later worked as a film distributor for Garrison Films before founding his own company, Brandon Films in November 1940. During the 1950s, Brandon Films owned the largest collection of 16mm available for general release in the United States. He was the first president of the New York Film Council, and helped to found the short-lived Film Forum in 1933 with Pulitzer Prize-winning playwright Sidney Howard. In 1968, Brandon sold his company to Macmillan; the new entity became known as Audio-Brandon. His work in the 1970s to reclaim and publicize the history of 1930s film activism is an important source for film historians.  Brandon's unpublished manuscripts and documents on radical film history are deposited at the New York Museum of Modern Art Film Study Center. Films from his collection were donated to several archives including the Museum of Modern Art and the U.S. Library of Congress, and others.

References

Pioneers: An Interview with Tom Brandon, Fred Sweet, Eugene Rosow, Allan Francovich and Tom Brandon, Film Quarterly, Vol. 27, No. 1 (Autumn, 1973), pp. 12–24 
Steven J. Ross, Working-Class Hollywood: Silent Film and the Shaping of Class in America
William Alexander, Film on the Left: American Documentary Film From 1931 to 1942
Russell Campbell, Cinema Strikes Back: Radical Filmmaking in the United States, 1930-42
Brad Chisholm, "Film and Photo League exhibition strategies," 
 MoMA Film Study Center
Labor Related Films in the Library of Congress Collection

Film distributors (people)
1908 births
1982 deaths